The  was an electric multiple unit (EMU) type operated by the private railway operator Nagoya Railroad (Meitetsu) on limited express services in Japan from May 1999 until June 2008. Two cars from each set were subsequently modified to create the 1700 series EMUs in conjunction with new 2300 series cars.

Formations
The fleet consisted of four three-car sets formed as follows.

Cars 2 and 3 were each fitted with a single-arm pantograph.

Interior
Passenger accommodation consisted of unidirectional seating arranged 2+2 abreast. Car 2 included a toilet and wheelchair space.

History
The trains were introduced on 10 May 1999.

References

Electric multiple units of Japan
1600 series
Train-related introductions in 1999
Tilting trains
Nippon Sharyo multiple units
1500 V DC multiple units of Japan